Nu Fornacis, Latinized from ν Fornacis, is a single, variable star in the southern constellation of Fornax. It is blue-white in hue and faintly visible to the naked eye with an apparent visual magnitude that fluctuates around 4.69. This body is located approximately 370 light years distant from the Sun based on parallax, and is drifting further away with a radial velocity of +18.5 km/s. It is a candidate member of the Pisces-Eridanus stellar stream, which suggests an age of 120 million years or less.

This object is an Ap star with a stellar classification of B9.5IIIspSi matching a late B-type giant star. The 'Si' suffix indicates an abundance anomaly of silicon. It is an Alpha2 Canum Venaticorum variable that ranges from magnitude 4.68 down to 4.73 with a period of 1.89 days – the same as its rotational period. It is 3.65 times as massive and 245 times as luminous as the Sun, with 3.44 times the Sun's diameter.

References

B-type giants
Alpha2 Canum Venaticorum variables
Ap stars

Fornacis, Nu
Durchmusterung objects
Fornax (constellation)
012767
009677
0612